The fixture between football clubs AIK and IFK Göteborg is a fierce rivalry in Sweden, between the two largest clubs from the two largest cities. The rivalry does not have a unique name, but is sometimes called the "Swedish El Clásico". The two clubs have, besides some Swedish local derbies, the largest rivalry in Swedish football. Fixtures are usually called "hate matches" and gather the largest nationwide interest out of any Swedish club fixtures. Due to the long history in the top division for both clubs, no other rivals in Swedish football have played each other more times (excluding friendly matches).

Rivalry culture

Honours

Matches

Sources:

League

AIK at home

IFK Göteborg at home

Cup

Other competitions

Records

Sources:

Biggest wins

Highest scoring matches

Longest win streak

Longest unbeaten streak

Highest attendances

Shared player history

Played for both

Played for one, managed one

Played for both, managed one

Played for one, managed both

Played for both, managed both

Managed both

Notes

Citations

References

External links
Sveriges Fotbollshistoriker och Statistiker – Statistics for all Allsvenskan and Svenska Cupen matches
AIK official website
IFK Göteborg official website

AIK Fotboll
IFK Göteborg
Football derbies in Sweden